"Let's Start Right Now" is a song recorded by Barbra Streisand set to the music of the Brazilian song "Raios de Luz" written by Brazilian songwriters Cristovão Bastos and Abel Silva released in 1991 by Simone. Its English lyrics were written by Roxanne Seeman and are unrelated to the original Portuguese-language song.

The song was recorded with a 72-piece orchestra arranged and conducted by Jorge Calandrelli at the Sony Pictures Studio Scoring Stage in 1999, produced by Barbra Streisand during the "A Love Like Ours" album sessions. Humberto Gatica was the recording engineer. Barbra Streisand and Jay Landers are the executive producers of the track.

"Let's Start Right Now" was included as a promotional bonus CD single (Columbia #CSK 43719) in a limited edition of Barbra Streisand's "A Love Like Ours" album (Columbia #CK 63981) sold exclusively at Sam Goody and all U.S. Musicland Group stores.

"Let's Start Right Now" appears as a bonus track on the international CD single release of the Barbra Streisand & Vince Gill duet, "If You Ever Leave Me". Versions of this single were released September - October 1999 with Let's Start Right Now included on the September 13, 1999 in Holland (#667801-2), October 18, 1999 in the UK (#668124-2), and Australia (EP CD 667914–2) releases.

Raios de Luz 
"Raios de Luz" (sometimes written as Raio de Luz) is the original Portuguese-language song by Simone, cited by producer Quincy Jones as "one of the world's greatest singers". The music is composed by Cristóvão Bastos with lyrics written by Abel Silva. It is the first track on Simone's "Raio de Luz" album, produced by Marco Mazzola, and released by Columbia in 1991. The song is noted for its theme of romantic love and passion, frequent in Simone's repertoire. Raios de Luz was included again in Sou Eu, in 1993. 

Raios de Luz by Simone was the theme song of the TV series Of Body And Soul (De Corpo e Alma). It also appeared in Xou da Xuxa.

Personnel

 Simone - vocals, co-producer, music director
 Cristovão Bastos - arranger, piano
 Chiquinho de Moraes - string arranger
 Dener de Castro Campolina - contrabass
 Ricardo Raymundo - contrabass
 Alfredo Vidal - violin
 Carlos Eduardo Hack - violin
 Giancarlo Pareschi - violin
 João Daltro de Almeida - violin
 José Alves da Silva - violin
 Michel Bessler - violin
 Paschoal Perrota - violin
 Walter Hack - violin
 Alceu de Almeida Reis - cello
 Jorge Kundert Ranevsky (Iura) - cello
 Arlindo Figueiredo Penteado - viola
 Geraldo Augusto da Costa Monte - viola
 Jesuína Noronha Passaroto - viola
 Maria Léa Magalhães - viola

Production 

 Mazzola - producer
 Antonio Foguete – production assistant
 Impressão Digital Studios (RJ), recording studio
 Marcelo Sabóia – recording engineer
 Rogério (Bigin), Geraldo (Ya Ya), Marcelo (Load) - assistant recording engineering
 Mazzola – mixing
 Keith Rose - assistant mixer
 Mike Fuller, Fullersound Inc. - master engineering
 Carlos Nunes - art direction
 Garrido - photography

Jermaine Jackson version

May 19, 2003, Jermaine Jackson performed "Let's Start Right Now" live on-camera on "The View (U.S. TV series)" talk show, introduced by Barbara Walters.

Other versions
The Brasilian singer Leila Maria released "Let's Start Right Now" on her album "Off Key" initially released in Brasil by Rob Digital. It was released in Germany by ZYX Music. Cristovão Bastos, the composer of the song, arranged and played piano on the recording.

References

External links
Let's Start Right Now on IMDb
Let's Start Right Now on YouTube
Jermaine Jackson performs "Let's Start Right Now" on The View on YouTube
 

Barbra Streisand songs
1999 songs
Songs written by Roxanne Seeman
Portuguese-language songs
Jermaine Jackson songs
English-language Portuguese songs